Herring salad (Finnish: sillisalaatti, Swedish: sillsallad, Norwegian: sildesalaten) is a mixed salad consisting of cut and salted herring, beetroot, potato, onion, mayonnaise and whipped cream.

Finnish herring salad
Finnish herring salad is called rosolli and is part of the Finnish joulupöytä. The salad is made of cooked potatoes and carrots cut into small cubical pieces and served on a tray. It can also contain cucumber, apple, onion and herring. If the salad does not contain herring it is called beetroot salad. The salad can be eaten with a sauce made of whipped cream and vinegar.

The name "rosolli" comes from the Russian language. The original Russian word "rassol" meant a brine of pickled gherkins. The Swedish word sillsallad is thought to have inspired the word sinsalla which is used to refer to rosolli in Ostrobothnia.

See also 
 Dressed herring

Finnish cuisine
Salads